Waterperry is a village beside the River Thame, about  east of Oxford in Oxfordshire and close to the county boundary with Buckinghamshire. The Church of England parish church of Saint Mary the Virgin is partly Saxon and has notable medieval stained glass, sculptural memorials, Georgian box pews and memorial brasses.

The 2011 Census combined data for the village with Waterstock, due to the small population of the village.

Waterperry House is a 17th-century mansion, remodelled early in the 18th century for Sir John Curson and again around 1820. It is now a house of seven bays and three storeys with a balustraded parapet and Ionic porch.

The house has extensive grounds, and until 1971 housed the Waterperry School of Horticulture under Beatrix Havergal. Since 1971 the house has been owned and used as a country retreat by the School of Economic Science. The gardens are now a horticultural business and visitor destination, Waterperry Gardens. The  of gardens include rose and alpine gardens, a formal knot garden, trained fruit and nursery beds and a riverside walk. The grounds also have nurseries, orchards, plant centre and teashop. Gardening courses are still taught here. The grounds host the annual Art in Action festival of art and craft each July.

References

Sources and further reading

External links

West Gallery Churches: Oxfordshire Waterperry St Mary the Virgin
Waterperry Gardens
Art in Action

Villages in Oxfordshire
South Oxfordshire District